Estadio Merkatondoa, is a stadium in Estella-Lizarra, Navarra, Spain. It has a capacity of 3,500 spectators and opened in 1929.  It is the home of CD Izarra of the Segunda División B.

History
Merkatondoa opened on 11 November 1928 and much of what you see is as a result of building that took place in the 1987. And in 2009 an artificial surface was installed.

Stadium background
Stadium Merkatondoa (1928 – 1941)
Estadio San Andrés (1941 – 1978)
Estadio Merkatondoa (1978 – Present)

References

External links
 web oficial CD Izarra
 Estadios de Espana 
 Images
 Images

Izarra
Football venues in Navarre
Sports venues completed in 1929